Courtney Rene (born October 2, 1991), known professionally as Renni Rucci, is an American rapper from Columbia, South Carolina.

Early life 
Courtney Rene was born in 1991 and raised in Columbia, South Carolina.

Career 
Renni Rucci began to treat music seriously in 2017, performing freestyles over popular beats. In 2018, she achieved success for the first time by rapping over the beat of "Freestyle" by Lil' Baby. XXL noted that the video of her rapping over the aforementioned song has been viewed over five million times on YouTube. In 2019, Renni Rucci released her first mixtape, Big Renni, which was followed by QuickTape in 2020. In 2021, Renni Rucci was added to the cast of the TV show Love & Hip Hop: Atlanta. On March 18, 2022, she released the single "Don't Like Me". On October 28, Renni Rucci released "Keep the Change".

Discography 

 Big Renni (2019)
 QuickTape (2020)

Filmography

References 

1991 births
Living people
21st-century women rappers
Rappers from South Carolina
American women rappers
Musicians from Columbia, South Carolina